MyHDL is a Python-based hardware description language (HDL).

Features of MyHDL include:
 The ability to generate VHDL and Verilog code from a MyHDL design.
 The ability to generate a testbench (Conversion of test benches) with test vectors in VHDL or Verilog, based on complex computations in Python.
 The ability to convert a list of signals.
 The ability to convert output verification.
 The ability to do co-simulation with Verilog.
 An advanced datatype system, independent of traditional datatypes. MyHDL's translator tool automatically writes conversion functions when the target language requires them.

MyHDL is developed by Jan Decaluwe.

Conversion examples 

Here, you can see some examples of conversions from MyHDL designs to VHDL and/or Verilog.

A small combinatorial design

The example is a small combinatorial design, more specifically the binary to Gray code converter:
def bin2gray(B, G, width: int):
    """Gray encoder.

    B -- input intbv signal, binary encoded
    G -- output intbv signal, gray encoded
    width -- bit width
    """

    @always_comb
    def logic():
        Bext = intbv(0)[width + 1 :]
        Bext[:] = B
        for i in range(width):
            G.next[i] = Bext[i + 1] ^ Bext[i]

    return logic

You can create an instance and convert to Verilog and VHDL as follows:
width = 8

B = Signal(intbv(0)[width:])
G = Signal(intbv(0)[width:])

bin2gray_inst = toVerilog(bin2gray, B, G, width)
bin2gray_inst = toVHDL(bin2gray, B, G, width)

The generated Verilog code looks as follows:
module bin2gray (
    B,
    G
);

input [7:0] B;
output [7:0] G;
reg [7:0] G;

always @(B) begin: BIN2GRAY_LOGIC
    integer i;
    reg [9-1:0] Bext;
    Bext = 9'h0;
    Bext = B;
    for (i=0; i<8; i=i+1) begin
        G[i] <= (Bext[(i + 1)] ^ Bext[i]);
    end
end

endmodule

The generated VHDL code looks as follows:
library IEEE;
use IEEE.std_logic_1164.all;
use IEEE.numeric_std.all;
use std.textio.all;

use work.pck_myhdl_06.all;

entity bin2gray is
    port (
        B: in unsigned(7 downto 0);
        G: out unsigned(7 downto 0)
    );
end entity bin2gray;

architecture MyHDL of bin2gray is

begin

BIN2GRAY_LOGIC: process (B) is
    variable Bext: unsigned(8 downto 0);
begin
    Bext := to_unsigned(0, 9);
    Bext := resize(B, 9);
    for i in 0 to 8-1 loop
        G(i) <= (Bext((i + 1)) xor Bext(i));
    end loop;
end process BIN2GRAY_LOGIC;

end architecture MyHDL;

See also 
 Comparison of Free EDA software
 Comparison of EDA Software
 Electronic design automation (EDA)
 C to HDL compilers

References 

Hardware description languages